Polheim ("Home at the Pole") was Roald Amundsen's name for his camp (the first ever) at the South Pole. He arrived there on December 14, 1911, along with four other members of his expedition: Helmer Hanssen, Olav Bjaaland, Oscar Wisting, and Sverre Hassel.

Calculations 
At the first estimated position of the South Pole, Amundsen declared "So we plant you, dear flag, on the South Pole, and give the plain on which it lies the name King Haakon VII's Plateau." Both the Norwegian and Fram's flag were planted.

Due to the historical disputes over the claims of polar explorers prior to Amundsen's expedition, particularly the competing claims of Frederick Cook and Robert Peary to have reached the North Pole first, Amundsen took special care in making his polar observations.

Approaching the Geographic South Pole (or North Pole) the meridians of longitude converge, eventually making a measure of longitude meaningless, as a degree of longitude will become smaller and smaller. At the pole itself, assuming one has accurate enough instruments, all meridians meet. Amundsen reasoned that the extra effort in obtaining longitude could be saved, and he focused on latitude. Amundsen had adopted this strategy after attending a lecture at The Royal Geographical Society in London in November 1909, given by the British astronomer and geographer, Arthur Robert Hinks. In his lecture on Surveying and Cartography at Cambridge University, Hinks put forward this theory when discussing the subject of determining positions near the Pole.

With the instruments he had, Amundsen estimated that he could determine the position of the pole by no better than a nautical mile (1.85 km). In order to ensure that there was no doubt that his expedition had in fact reached the South Pole, he determined to encircle, or "box" the pole.

Three members of the expedition were sent out from the current estimated position of the pole, one continuing on the current expedition track and two at right angles to this direction. Each skier continued  and erected a spare sledge runner with a black flag and note for Robert Falcon Scott when and if he arrived. Scott did not arrive until more than a month later. The note contained the position to Amundsen's camp.

While the skiers erected the encircling markers, Amundsen took altitudes of the sun for fixing his position. Since his theodolite had been damaged, observations were made with a sextant, the sun slowly circling the camp in 24 hours, and never setting.

This point had been "boxed" by the skiers.

On December 17 Amundsen proceeded to his estimate of the true South Pole position, and took additional observations for 24 hours, two men standing watch for each observation, and co-signing each other's navigation books. Again, this was to ensure that there was no doubt as to the expedition attaining the pole. Four out of the five men in the polar party were trained navigators, Olav Bjaaland being the only one without such training.

From these calculations, it was determined that they were still  from the pole, and two men were sent to erect additional pennants.

Finally, Amundsen added still more pennants to cover the remaining area. In this way, the pole had been boxed three times all told.

The official expedition camera had been damaged en route to the pole, so the only photographs taken were from an amateur camera brought by expedition member Olav Bjaaland.

On December 18, 1911, Amundsen's expedition left Polheim, leaving behind his reserve tent, along with a letter for Scott and a letter intended for Scott to deliver to King Haakon VII in case Amundsen failed to return. Both letters were later found with the bodies of Scott and his companions, and were further proof that Amundsen had attained the pole.

When Amundsen's calculations were verified, it was found that his final camp lay within 2.3 km (2500 yards) of the mathematical South Pole. In addition, it had been ascertained that expedition member Helmer Hanssen—one of the expedition members who had been skiing in a grid pattern between the 'box' markers—came to within  of the mathematical South Pole on one of his runs.

The tent 

The tent has not been seen since Scott's party left it in January 1912. Determining the present location of Amundsen's tent requires consideration of the precision of Amundsen's navigation in 1911, the flow of ice since then, and the amount of burial by intervening snow fall. The present location of the tent has been calculated to be 89° 58′ 51″ S, 46° 14′ E, with around  uncertainty in the position.

See also 
 Amundsen–Scott South Pole Station
 Framheim
 List of Antarctic Field Camps

References

Further reading
 Roald Amundsen wrote about the expedition in Sydpolen published in two volumes in 1912–1913. The work was translated into English by A. G. Chater, and published as The South Pole: An Account of the Norwegian Antarctic Expedition in the "Fram," 1910–1912. (London: John Murray. 1912)
 Huntford, Roland (1979) Scott and Amundsen (Hodder & Stoughton Ltd) 
 Huntford, Roland (1999) The Last Place on Earth (Modern Library Exploration) 

Outposts of Antarctica
Amundsen's South Pole expedition
1911 establishments in Antarctica
1911 disestablishments in Antarctica